The Found Centennial 100 is a Canadian six-seat cabin monoplane produced by Found Brothers Aviation.

Design and development
The Centennial 100 was developed as an improved version of the Found FBA-2. Design work started in October 1966 and the prototype first flew on 7 April 1967. The aircraft is powered by a 290 hp (216 kW) Avco Lycoming IO-540-G1D5 engine. Three prototypes and two production aircraft were built and were used to gain certification for the type in July 1968. No further aircraft were built as the company went out of business.

Specifications (Centennial)

References

Citations

Bibliography
 Taylor, John W.R. Jane's All The World's Aircraft 1969-70. London:Jane's Yearbooks, 1969.
 The Illustrated Encyclopedia of Aircraft (Part Work 1982-1985). London: Orbis Publishing.

See also

Found Aircraft
Found FBA-2

1960s Canadian civil utility aircraft
High-wing aircraft
Single-engined tractor aircraft
Aircraft first flown in 1967